The Papua bow-fingered gecko (Cyrtodactylus papuensis) is a species of gecko that is endemic to southern Papua New Guinea.

References 

Cyrtodactylus
Reptiles described in 1934